Harold Jefferson Davall (May 5, 1879 – November 21, 1931) was an American college football player and coach, engineer, and railroad supervisor. He served as the head football coach at West Virginia University in 1902 and the College of William & Mary in 1903, compiling a career college football coaching record of 8–7. Born in Camden, New Jersey, Davall played football as an End at Cornell University before graduating with an engineering degree.

Davall was married to Agnes C. McLaughlin, a public school teacher, at the Church of the Immaculate Conception in Camden, on June 17, 1907. During World War I, Davall served as a captain in the United States Army Corps of Engineers and was stationed at Camp A. A. Humphreys in Fairfax County, Virginia. He was later supervisor of the Pennsylvania Railroad's Trenton Division. Davall died on November 21, 1931, at his home in Jamesburg, New Jersey, following a heart attack. He was buried in Arlington National Cemetery.

Head coaching record

References

1879 births
1931 deaths
19th-century players of American football
20th-century American engineers
American football ends
American railroad mechanical engineers
Cornell Big Red football players
West Virginia Mountaineers football coaches
William & Mary Tribe football coaches
United States Army officers
United States Army personnel of World War I
Sportspeople from Camden, New Jersey
People from Jamesburg, New Jersey
Players of American football from Camden, New Jersey
Military personnel from New Jersey
Burials at Arlington National Cemetery